Peter of Oldenburg may refer to:

 Peter I, Grand Duke of Oldenburg (1755–1829), Regent of the Duchy of Oldenburg
 Peter II, Grand Duke of Oldenburg (1827–1900), Grand Duke of Oldenburg
 Duke Peter Georgievich of Oldenburg (1812–81), Duke of the House of Oldenburg
 Duke Peter Alexandrovich of Oldenburg (1868–1924), first husband of Grand Duchess Olga Alexandrovna of Russia
 Peter Friedrich Wilhelm, Duke of Oldenburg (1754–1823), Duke of Oldenburg